Daisy Youngblood (born 1945) is an American modern sculptor and ceramic artist. She grew up in North Carolina and lives in New Mexico.  She was a 2003 recipient of a MacArthur Fellows Program genius grant.

Life
Youngblood was born in 1945 in Asheville, North Carolina. From 1963 to 1966, Youngblood attended Virginia Commonwealth University.

Youngblood's most well-known sculptural work comprises heads and torsos of people and animals made in low-fired clay, combined with found objects (sticks, teeth, hair).  Some of the heads are explicitly representational portraits (such as her 1982 study of the art dealer Richard Bellamy). Youngblood has listed Jung and Buddhism as important theoretical influences, and has said that she is interested in "correlating worldwide religions and esoteric practices with the individual psyche."

In 1999, her work appeared at McKee Gallery. Her work is in the collection of the San Francisco Museum of Modern Art and the Museum of Modern Art.

See also
 low-fire pottery: earthenware and terra cotta

References

External links

Review of her work from Artforum, October 1999.
Images of her work from the McKee Gallery (New York)
"Centaur with a mohawk head", Christies, 1–2 July 2008

1945 births
Living people
MacArthur Fellows
American women sculptors
American women ceramists
American ceramists
20th-century American women artists
20th-century American sculptors
20th-century ceramists
21st-century American women artists
21st-century American sculptors
21st-century ceramists
Sculptors from North Carolina
Virginia Commonwealth University alumni